Joseph-Roland Comtois (3 March 1929 – 31 October 2020) is a former a Liberal party member of the House of Commons of Canada. He was a professional engineer, soldier and reservist by career.

History

Comtois' first attempts to enter national politics were unsuccessful as he was defeated at the Joliette—L'Assomption—Montcalm riding in the 1962 and 1963 federal elections.

Comtois won the riding on his third attempt in the 1965 federal election after its Progressive Conservative incumbent, Louis-Joseph Pigeon, did not seek re-election. Following rearrangement of riding boundaries, Comtois was re-elected at Terrebonne riding in the 1968, 1972 and 1974 federal elections.

In 1976, Comtois resigned his federal seat to become a candidate in the Quebec provincial election. This attempt was unsuccessful and he won back his federal seat at Terrebonne in a 24 May 1977 by-election. He won further re-election in the 1979 and 1980 federal elections. He left federal politics after his defeat to Progressive Conservative Robert Toupin in the 1984 federal election.

Comtois served in the 27th through 32nd Canadian Parliaments, except for his brief resignation during the 30th Parliament.

In 2005, Comtois was the recipient of the Distinguished Service Award of the Canadian Association of Former Parliamentarians.

Electoral record

References

External links
 
 

1929 births
2020 deaths
Members of the House of Commons of Canada from Quebec
Liberal Party of Canada MPs
People from Sainte-Julie, Quebec
French Quebecers